is a Japanese manga series by Hikaru Miyoshi, based on the Psycho-Pass anime series. It was serialized in Shueisha's shōnen manga magazine Jump Square from November 2012 to May 2013, and later on the magazine's official website from June 2013 to December 2014.

Publication
Kanshikan Tsunemori Akane by Hikaru Miyoshi is based on the anime series Psycho-Pass and focuses on the title character Akane Tsunemori as she works as an inspector within the Bureau forces from dystopian Japan labeled as Sybil System. The manga was serialized in Shueisha's shōnen manga magazine Jump Square from November 2, 2012, to May 2, 2013. It later ran on the magazine's website from June 4, 2013, to December 4, 2014. Shueisha collected its chapters in six tankōbon volumes, released from February 4, 2013, to January 5, 2015.

Volume list

Reception
As of November 2013, the manga had 380,000 copies in circulation. As of December 2014, the manga had over 1 million copies in circulation. The six volumes debuted on Oricon's weekly chart of best-selling manga; the first volume debuted #14 (47,401 copies sold); the second volume debuted #20 (56,500 copies sold); the third volume debuted #24 (37,483 copies sold); the fourth volume debuted #20 (34,874 copies sold); the fifth volume debuted #16 (61,344 copies sold); the sixth volume debuted #12 (79,259 copies sold).

Fantasy Mundo's Patricia Llamas stated the manga adaptation was faithful to Akane's characterization as it explored the deep bond with Kogami and the flaws with the Sybil System, a theme also explored with the other members of the cast.

See also
 Moriarty the Patriot, a manga series with illustrations by Hikaru Miyoshi

References

External links
 

Psycho-Pass
Shueisha manga
Shōnen manga